The 1998 season of the Bhutanese A-Division was the fourth recorded season of top-flight football in Bhutan. The league was won by Druk Pol, their third title in a row and the first time a Bhutanese team had achieved a hat-trick of titles.

References

Bhutan A-Division seasons
Bhutan
Bhutan
football